André Marty (Rieux-Minervois, 14 March 1931- Carcassonne, 7 April 2004) is a former French rugby league footballer who played as a er and .

Career
He played his entire for Carcassonne, with which he won the  French Championship title in 1952 and 1953, as well as the Lord Derby Cup in 1951, 1952, 1961 and 1963.
Thanks to his club performances, he won two caps for France between 1959 and 1960, taking part to the 1960 Rugby League World Cup.

Personal life
Off the field, he worked as a butcher.

Honours
Team honours:
French Champion in 1952 and 1953 (Carcassonne)
Winner of the Lord Derby Cup in 1951, 1952, 1961 and 1963 (Carcassonne)
 Runner-up at the French Championship in 1955. 1956 and 1958 (Carcassonne)
Runner-up at the Lord Derby Cup in 1960 (Carcassonne)

References

External links
André Marty at rugbyleagueproject.com

1931 births
2004 deaths
French rugby league players
Sporting Olympique Avignon players
AS Carcassonne players
Sportspeople from Pyrénées-Orientales
Rugby league wingers
Rugby league locks
France national rugby league team players